Armand-Charles de La Porte, Duc de La Meilleraye (1632 – 9 November 1713), was a French general, who was Grand Master and Captain General of Artillery.

Biography
The son of Charles de La Porte (called "Marshal de La Meilleraye") and nephew of Cardinal Richelieu, Armand-Charles was marquis de La Porte. He later became marquis de La Meilleraye and then duc de Mayenne. He served as Grand Master of the French Artillery in 1646 or 1648.

On 1 March 1661 he married Hortense Mancini, the favourite niece and heiress of the immensely wealthy Cardinal Mazarin. Upon his marriage, he became duc Mazarin. In addition, he was made a French peer, duc de La Meilleraye, prince de Château-Porcien, marquis de Montcornet, as well as comte de La Fère et de Marle.

The duke and his wife had four children:
 Marie Charlotte de La Porte Mazarin (28 March 1662 – 13 May 1729), who married Louis Armand de Vignerot du Plessis, comte d'Agénias, duc d'Aiguillon;
 Marie Anne de La Porte Mazarin (1663 – October 1720), who became an abbess;
 Marie Olympe de La Porte Mazarin (1665 – 24 January 1754), who married Louis Christophe Giqault, marquis de Bellefonds et de Boullaye;
 Paul Jules de La Porte, duc Mazarin et de La Meilleraye (25 January 1666 – 7 September 1731), who married Félice Armande Charlotte de Durfort.

The marriage proved quite unhappy due to the duke's mistreatment of his wife and general strange behaviour. He was miserly and extremely jealous, and mentally unstable. His strange behaviour included preventing milkmaids from going about their job (to his mind, the cows' udders had strong sexual connotations), having all of his female servants' front teeth knocked out to prevent them from attracting male attention, and chipping off and painting over all the "dirty bits" in his fantastic art collection. He forbade his wife to keep company with other men, made midnight searches for hidden lovers, insisted she spend a quarter of her day at prayer, and forced her to leave Paris and move with him to the country. 

In 1668 Hortense fled from France, in order to escape her abusive husband and eventually settled in England, where she became a mistress of King Charles II.

He died in the castle of La Meilleraye, today in ruins, (Beaulieu-sous-Parthenay) in 1713.

Sources

 Guyard de la Fosse, Histoire de Mayenne
 Bibliothèque nationale de France, fr. 11. 468 
 M. Pinard, Chronologie militaire, t. IV, p. 201 
 Relation d'Ezéchiel Spanheim 
 Grosse-Duperon, Souvenirs du Vieux-Mayenne 
 Grosse-Duperon, Etude sur Fontaine-Daniel

1632 births
1713 deaths
17th-century French people
18th-century French people
Dukes of Mayenne
French generals
17th-century peers of France
18th-century peers of France
Peers created by Louis XIV